Adelberger of Lombardy (fl. 760) was among several lay medical women who was taught by the historian Paul of Lombardy (720–800), a Benedictine monk from Como. Adelberger was the daughter of Desiderius (ruled 756–774). Very little information about Adelberger survives today.

Legacy 
Adelberger is a featured figure on Judy Chicago's installation piece The Dinner Party as one of the 999 names on the Heritage Floor.

Notes 

8th-century Italian physicians
Medieval women physicians
8th-century Italian women